The 2011–12 campaign was Huddersfield Town's eighth consecutive season in the third tier of English football. After losing to Peterborough United in the play-off final the previous season, Town hoped to avoid the play-offs and push for automatic promotion this season.

This season saw Town sack their manager for the first time since the 2008–09 season, when Lee Clark left the club on 15 February 2012. He was replaced by the former Leeds United boss, Simon Grayson on 20 February.

At the end of the season, Town finished in 4th place, meaning a 3rd consecutive season in the play-offs. They played Milton Keynes Dons in the semi-finals, and won 3–2 on aggregate, winning the away leg 2–0, before losing the home leg 2–1.

They played Sheffield United in the final at Wembley Stadium on 26 May. After the match finished 0–0 after extra time, the Terriers won the penalty shoot-out 8–7, after every player on the pitch took a penalty. The decisive penalty was taken by the United goalkeeper Steve Simonsen, who saw his penalty go over the crossbar, giving Huddersfield the glory, and promotion to the Football League Championship.

Squad at the start of the season

Kit
The 2011–12 season was the Club's first with technical kit supplier Umbro, and two new kits were introduced. Kirklees College and Radian B continued their home and away shirt sponsorships, respectively.

The home kit consists of a white shirt with three light blue stripes, white shorts and black socks. The away shirt is red with a white and black double-chevron, and was worn with black shorts and white socks. The shorts and socks of both these kits were interchangeable in the event of a colour clash. On 5 November, Town wore a charity kit in their game against Walsall in Help For Heroes colours – a limited number of replicas were sold with proceeds going to the charity.

|
|
|
|
|
|
|
|

Review
Despite losing in the play-off final, there isn't expected to be a mass exodus of players, mainly due to the fact that most of them are on long-term contracts, although Nathan Clarke and Robbie Simpson were told that they could look for new clubs.

Town's first signing of the close season was the right-back Calum Woods from newly promoted Scottish Premier League side Dunfermline Athletic on a free transfer on 8 June. On 1 July, two more signings were added to the team, defender/midfielder Oscar Gobern signed for a fee of £275,000, which was settled by a tribunal from Southampton, and winger Donal McDermott signed from Manchester City, also on a fee to be settled by a tribunal. Experienced midfielder Tommy Miller was then snapped up on a one-year deal following his release by Yorkshire rivals Sheffield Wednesday. On 8 July, Town confirmed the signing of defender Liam Cooper on a season-long loan from Championship side Hull City. On 11 July, winger Danny Ward, who had a successful loan spell at the Terriers at the end of the season, signed a permanent 3-year deal for an undisclosed fee from Bolton Wanderers. On 19 July, the Terriers signed Plymouth Argyle midfielder Damien Johnson on a second consecutive season-long loan. The midfield was further bolstered with the signing of Anton Robinson from Bournemouth on 1 August for an undisclosed fee. On 5 August, Clark signed Canadian goalkeeper Simon Thomas on a free transfer following a successful loan spell. On 23 November, after losing an appeal to get Alan Lee's red card he received against Notts County rescinded, Town signed striker Jon Parkin on a 2-month loan from Cardiff City, which ended on 23 January. The following day, as the loan transfer window shut, Leeds United defender Alex Bruce on loan until 2 January 2012, but Leeds terminated it on 29 December. On 24 January 2012, Town brought in Reading defender Sean Morrison on loan for the rest of the season, after failing to make an appearance while on loan with the club the previous season. Just as the transfer window shut on 31 January, Town signed young Scottish centre-back Murray Wallace from Scottish First Division side Falkirk for an undisclosed fee, with Wallace returning to the Bairns for the remainder of the current season. His teammate at Falkirk, Kallum Higginbotham also joined Town for an undisclosed fee on the same day. On 16 March Town signed Uruguayan international midfielder Diego Arismendi on loan from Stoke City until the end of the season.

The first departure from the club during the post-season was right-back Lee Peltier, who joined Championship side Leicester City on 21 June, for an undisclosed fee, believed to be around £750,000. Following him out of the Galpharm was young defender Leigh Franks who joined Conference North side Alfreton Town on 23 June. Next to go was winger Anthony Pilkington, who joined Premier League new boys Norwich City on 6 July for an undisclosed fee, believed to be around £2 million. Young striker Jimmy Spencer joined Cheltenham Town on a 6-month loan on 20 July. 19 year-old midfielder Chris Atkinson left on a six-month loan deal at Conference National side Darlington on 25 July. On 19 August Nathan Clarke joined fellow League One side Oldham Athletic on loan until the end of January. Just as the transfer window shut on 31 August, young midfielder Aidan Chippendale joined Scottish Premier League side Inverness Caledonian Thistle on loan until January 2012. Tom Clarke left the club on 9 September, joining Leyton Orient on a 93-day emergency loan, and Robbie Simpson joined Oldham Athletic for the same deal the following day. They both returned to the Galpharm on 12 December. Simpson then returned to Oldham on 2 January, before making the move permanent on 30 January. Left-back Liam Ridehalgh joined Football League Two side Swindon Town on a month's loan on 28 September, which was extended to the end of the year, before he returned. On 4 November, young defender Greg Pearson joined Blyth Spartans on a month's loan. On 24 November, Jamie McCombe joined Preston North End on loan until 2 January 2012, but it was cut short on 22 December, owing to defensive injuries at Town, but then the following day, it was revealed that the termination could not go ahead for administrative reasons, so he stayed at Preston. On 5 January 2012, Liam Ridehalgh was sent on loan again, this time to Town's fellow League One side Chesterfield. On 31 January, as the transfer window shut, Donal McDermott left the club, just 6 months after joining to go to his former club, A.F.C. Bournemouth for an undisclosed fee. On 9 March, Nathan Clarke left on loan for Bury for the remainder of the season, and young midfielder Matt Crooks joined Conference North side F.C. Halifax Town for the rest of the season as well. On 22 March, just as the loan window shut, Kallum Higginbotham was sent on loan to Barnsley for the rest of the season, although he was recalled on 26 April. On 29 March, goalkeeper Lloyd Allinson was loaned out to Ilkeston for the rest of the season. On 27 April, Icelandic international Joey Guðjónsson had his contract terminated, citing "family reasons", and he returned home to his native Iceland, to play for his hometown club, ÍA.

Squad at the end of the season

Transfers

In

Loans in

Out

Loans out

Statistics

Overview

League table

Results summary

Results by round

Squad statistics

Appearances and goals

Top scorers

Disciplinary record

Results

Pre-season

League One

Football League One play-offs

FA Cup

Carling Cup

Johnstone's Paint Trophy

References

Huddersfield Town A.F.C. seasons
Huddersfield